The SS Tuxpam was an oil tanker, in the service of Petroleos Mexicanos, that was sunk on 27 June 1942 by U-129.

She was completed in November 1903 as SS Prometheus for Deutsch-Amerikanische Petroleum GmbH, Hamburg. In 1914 she was laid up at New York City and, in December of that year, sold and renamed SS Cushing for Standard Oil of New Jersey, Bayonne. In September 1918, she was requisitioned by the US Navy as USS Chinampa (SP-1952) for the Naval Overseas Transportation Service and returned to her owners in May 1919.

In 1924, she was sold to Italian owners and renamed Americano for Cia Nav. Cisterna SA, Genoa, before her eventual sale, in 1937, to Ditta G.M. Barbagelata, also of Genoa. After being laid up in Tampico, from June 1940 onwards, she was seized by the Mexican government and renamed SS Tuxpam on 8 Apr, 1941.

However, one torpedo malfunctioned and the U-boat had to dive to evade it. The tanker settled by the stern, after being hit by the other torpedo, but did not sink, so the U-boat surfaced and opened fire with deck guns. Tuxpam caught fire and sank after 52 rounds had been fired.

Notes

1942 in Mexico
Military history of Mexico during World War II
Ships of Mexico
Shipwrecks in the Gulf of Mexico
Ships sunk by German submarines in World War II
World War II shipwrecks in the Caribbean Sea
Maritime incidents in June 1942
Oil tankers
1903 ships